Talat Phlu or Talad Phlu is a community and marketplace by the canal Khlong Bangkok Yai in Talat Phlu subdistrict, Thon Buri district, Thonburi side of Bangkok.

History and present
Talat Phlu has a history of over 200 years since Thonburi Kingdom, in the reign of King Taksin after the fall of Ayutthaya in 1767. Thonburi side, being used as the new capital of Siam (name of Thailand at that time). Talat Phlu was a community of overseas Chinese or Thai-Chinese, including Muslims and Mon. Until the reign of King Rama I, he moved the capital across the Chao Phraya river to the Phra Nakhon side. Most of the Chinese moved to live in Sampheng, but some of them are still here and descend to the present day.

The name "Talat Phlu" originated this area in the past was the vast phlu (betel) plantations of Thai-Chinese, spreading along Khlong Bang Sai Kai to Khlong Bang Phrom as far as Khlong Bang Waek areas. The collected phlu were sold in the area starting from the dyke in front of Wat Ratchakhrue till Wat Intharam temples, turning this place to be the big and main wholesale market of mak (Areca catechu) and phlu. Hence the name "Talat Phlu" (betel market) in Thai. Today, although planting a betel have disappeared, the name Talat Phlu is still used for this area.

At its heyday (around 1950s–1960s), Talat Phlu was a bustling district, which spawned the phrase "Yaowarat is how, Talat Phlu like that", because Talat Phlu is considered to be another of Bangkok's Chinatowns apart from Yaowarat.

Nowadays, Talat Phlu is the famous scrumptious street food place. Besides, there are many shophouses and buildings with delicate stucco and wooden fretwork decorations in Chinese style along the road beside the canal worth being observed.

Geography
Neighbouring subdistricts are (from the north clockwise): Wat Tha Phra in Bangkok Yai District (Khlong Bangkok Yai is a borderline), Bang Yi Ruea in its district (Khlong Bang Nam Chon is a borderline), Bukkhalo and Dao Khanong in its district with Bang Kho of Chom Thong District (Ratchaphruek Road, Khlong Bang Sakae, Khlong Yaek Bang Sakae 13 and Khlong Wat Mai Yai Nui 1 are the borderlines), Bang Kho of Chom Thong District and Pak Khlong Phasi Charoen of Phasi Charoen District (Khlong Dan is a borderline), respectively.

Talat Phlu has a total area of 1.823 km2 (about 0.703 mi2).

The name "Talat Phlu" could be taken in a broad sense to encompass the areas of Talat Phlu (subdistrict), Bang Yi Ruea, Bukkhalo, Dao Khanong, it is more often used to refer to the subdistrict only.

Demography
Talat Phlu had a total population of 15,440 people and 14,735 households (December 2020).

Transportation
Talat Phlu can be reached by the State Railway of Thailand (SRT)'s Talat Phlu Railway Station on Mae Klong Railway Line.

The area is close to Talat Phlu BTS station on the BTS Skytrain's Silom Line, as well as Pho Nimit BTS and Wutthakat BTS stations.

Ratchadaphisek and Thoet Thai Roads are the main street of the area. Soi Phet Kasem 23 (Soi Punyalit Seni) is a shortcut to reach Talat Phlu from Phet Kasem Road in Phasi Charoen area.

References

External links

Neighbourhoods of Bangkok
Thon Buri district
Road junctions in Bangkok
Retail markets in Bangkok
Chinese-Thai culture
Food markets